Grant James Williams (born May 10, 1974) is an American football coach and offensive tackle who played nine seasons in the National Football League (NFL). He was a member of the Super Bowl-winning New England Patriots in 2002. Williams attended Clinton High School in Clinton, Mississippi and was a letterman in football, basketball, baseball, and track and field. He played college football at Louisiana Tech University.

Professional Career

Signed by the Seattle Seahawks in 1996 after going undrafted in the 1996 NFL Draft, Grant spent 4 years with the team before going to the New England Patriots. During his 2-year stint with the Patriots, he would win Super Bowl XXXVI in 2001 when the Patriots beat the Rams 20–17. In 2002, he joined the St. Louis Rams, where he spent the final 3 seasons of his career with before retiring.

Coaching career
In 2019, he was hired by the St. Louis BattleHawks of the XFL as assistant offensive line coach. Prior to the XFL, he was in the same position at Lindenwood University.

Personals life
Grant is married; he and his wife Emily have several children. He is currently the chaplain to the St. Louis Cardinals through Athletes in Action.

References

External links
 Lindenwood profile

1974 births
Living people
American football offensive tackles
Hinds Eagles football players
Lindenwood Lions football coaches
Louisiana Tech Bulldogs football players
New England Patriots players
Seattle Seahawks players
St. Louis BattleHawks coaches
St. Louis Rams players
People from Clinton, Mississippi
Sportspeople from Hattiesburg, Mississippi
Coaches of American football from Mississippi
Players of American football from Mississippi